Thanipadi is a panchayat town in Thandarampattu Taluk, Tiruvanamalai district, Tamil Nadu India. It is the largest and oldest town in the taluk. It was rewarded 3rd grade town panchayat in 1967 (at that time it was in Chengam taluk) and in 2001 it is rewarded 2nd grade town panchayat. In 2006, it was joined in Thandarampet Taluk carved out from Chengam and Thiruvannamalai taluks. Its zip code (or) Pin code is 606708.

References 

Cities and towns in Tiruvannamalai district